Race the Train is an annual cross country running event that takes place in  Tywyn, Mid Wales. The race is organised by Tywyn Rotary Club, and attracts runners from all over the world. The event has featured both in local and national media, including the BBC's Countryfile programme.

History

The event was the idea of local dentist, Godfrey Worsey, and was first run in 1984 with around 48 runners. The following year, this had increased to 250 runners. In 2008, there were 822 runners in the main race; the winner completing the course in just over 1 hour 18 minutes, a course record.The time beat the previous record, set in 2005:

Route

The course is mostly over public footpaths and local privately owned farmland, with the permission of the landowners, though the first and last sections are on public roads. Although only the elite runners stay ahead of the train for the full distance, the train stops in various locations to take on water, pass other trains or to run round at Abergynolwyn, allowing other runners to overtake.

Additionally, there are shorter races in the morning, as follows:
Quarry Challenge -  from Quarry Siding Halt to Tywyn.
Tynllwynhen Challenge -  from Tynllwynhen Halt to Tywyn.
Toddlers trot for children round the perimeter of the race field.

Event under threat
In March 2009, it was announced that the August race may be the last, unless more volunteers can be found to help organise the event. Due to a strong response from the local community, these fears have been allayed and it was announced in the 2009 Race Programme, that the event's future was secured for a number of years.

References

External links
Talyllyn Railway website
Race the Train website

Talyllyn Railway
Athletics competitions in Wales
Cross country running competitions
Cross country running in the United Kingdom
Annual events in Wales
Annual sporting events in the United Kingdom